Superintendent Battle is a fictional character created by Agatha Christie who appeared in five of her novels.

Novels featuring Superintendent Battle
He appears as a detective in the following novels:

 The Secret of Chimneys (1925)
 The Seven Dials Mystery (1929 – including some of the same characters, notably Lady Eileen "Bundle" Brent)
 Cards on the Table (1936, with Hercule Poirot, Ariadne Oliver and Colonel Race)
 Murder is Easy (1939) – titled as Easy to Kill in the US.
 Towards Zero (1944)

Police detective

Battle is notable for his stolid good sense and careful management of information as a case proceeds. He relies in part on the public notion that police detectives are stupid or unimaginative, when he has a good idea of just what is happening. His moustache is impressive, even to Hercule Poirot. Until Towards Zero the reader knows nothing of his domestic arrangements (with exception to a comment in Chimneys, when he mentions that he is "very attached of Mrs Battle"), but in this novel we learn that he has a wife and five children, the youngest of whom (Sylvia) unwittingly provides a key clue to the mystery. In the Hercule Poirot novel The Clocks, the pseudonymous secret agent Colin Lamb is heavily implied to be the son of the now-retired Battle.

Battle also has a secret professional life that is revealed in the denouement to The Seven Dials Mystery, but this is never referred to again. In this novel he states, that 
"half the people who spent their lives avoiding being run over buses had much better be run over and put safely out of the way. They're no good."

Similar statements are given by Major Despard in Cards on the Table and Michael Rodgers in Endless Night and might be approved by Mrs Christie as well.

Battle is in many respects typical of Christie's police officers, being (like Inspector Japp), more careful and intelligent than the police officers of early detective fiction, who had served only as foils for the brilliance of the amateur sleuth.

References

Bibliography

 Barnard, Robert (1980): A Talent to Deceive, Fontana/Collins

External links
Superintendent Battle at Hercule Poirot Central

 
Literary characters introduced in 1925
Fictional British police detectives
Agatha Christie characters
Fictional contract bridge players